The free trade agreements of Israel represent Israel's cooperation in multinational trade pacts and participation in the global economy. Israel's first free trade agreement was signed in 1985 with the United States of America. Since then, Israel has signed 14 free trade agreements (free trade agreements) with 46 countries and economic blocks such as the European Union, the European Free Trade Association and Mercosur.

Free trade agreements

In force or provisionally in force

United States of America 

Israel and the United States signed the Israel–United States Free Trade Agreement, which was the first United States free trade agreement with a country outside of North America. The free trade agreement came into force on 1 September 1985. To be party to the free trade agreement,  goods must be a product of Israel or the United States or have had a significant portion produced in Israel or USA.

In 2004, the agreement was extended to agricultural products and telecommunication equipment. In 2017 it was further expanded to include rules of origin.

The United States and Israel are also party to the Qualified Industrial Zone agreement, which serves to promote co-production and economic cooperation between Israel and Egypt.

European Free Trade Association 

Israel and the European Free Trade Association (EFTA), which includes Switzerland, Norway, Iceland and Liechtenstein, signed a free trade agreement in 1992 which came into force a year later. The free trade agreement originally included trade of goods, rules of origin, and intellectual property rights, and in 2018 was updated to extend to agricultural products.

Jordan 

The free trade agreement between Israel and Jordan was signed in 1995, one year after the 1994 Israel–Jordan peace treaty in 1994. The agreement of 1995 includes rules of origin and goods that are 100%, 50% or 30% duty-free. The free trade agreement was updated. in 2004

European Union 

The free trade agreement between Israel and the EU was signed on 20 November 1995 and came into force on 1 June 2000.
The original free trade agreement included clauses on rules of origin, duties, service and industrial trades and co-operations, tourism, and transport, and was updated in 2010 to include agriculture.

In 2013 Israel and the EU signed the Agreement on Conformity Assessment and Acceptance of Industrial, giving good manufacturing practice exemption to the Israeli medical industry and easing the export of medical goods from Israel to the European Union.

Turkey 

Israel and Turkey signed a free trade agreement on 14 March 1996, which came into force on 1 May 1997.The free trade agreement covers topics including duties on agriculture, industry and services to right of origin.
The free trade agreement was updated in 2006 and 2007.

Canada 

Israel and Canada signed their first free trade agreement on 31 July 1996 which came into force in 1 January 1997, listing a number of goods without duties or with low fees of duty.
Israel and Canada also signed an agreement on telecommunication equipment.
The free trade agreement was updated in 2019, eliminating tariffs on goods from Israel and Canada.

Mexico 

Israel and Mexico signed a free trade agreement on 10 April 2000, and updated the free trade agreement in 2008 on the matter of technology.

Mercosur 
Israel and Mercosur signed a free trade agreement on 8 December 2007 and the free trade agreement came into force on 1 June 2010. Venezuela suspended their relationship with Israel in 2009, and was later suspended from Mercosur in 2016. Mercosur extended the free trade agreement with Israel in 2012.

Colombia 

The free trade agreement between Israel and Colombia was signed in 2013 and came into force in 2020. The free trade agreement includes exemption or reduction of duties on different types of industrial goods, which enjoys 5% - 35% duties and other sectors such as agriculture.

Panama 

The free trade agreement between Israel and Panama was signed in 2018 and came into force in 2020.

Ukraine 

Israel and Ukraine signed a free trade agreement on 21 January 2019; it came into force on 1 January 2021.
The agreement exempted from duties goods such as industrial products, agricultural products, raw materials and more.

United Kingdom 

Due to Brexit, the United Kingdom withdrew from the free trade agreement between the EU and Israel. Israel and the United Kingdom signed their free trade agreement in 2019 before Brexit came into effect. The free trade agreement came into force on 1 January 2021 and replaced the Israel-EU free trade agreement.

South Korea 

Israel and South Korea have signed a free trade agreement on 12 May 2021 to improve investments, removing barriers, and other topics. The FTA includes electronics, cosmetics, cars, and more.
Date of entry is the 01.01.2023.

United Arab Emirates

Israel and the United Arab Emirates (UAE) signed a free trade agreement on 31 May 2022.  Tariffs will be removed or reduced on 96% of goods traded between the nations. The UAE predicted the Comprehensive Economic Partnership Agreement would boost annual bilateral trade to more than $10 billion within five years.

Israel and the United Arab Emirates ratified their free trade agreement on 11 December 2022.

Signed free trade agreements
Israel currently is party to two free trade agreements that have been signed but not have entered into force.

   (1 April 2022)
  (8 September 2022)

Under negotiation 
Israel is negotiating bilateral free trade agreements with the following countries and trade blocs:

See also
 Economy of Israel
 Foreign relations of Israel
 Free trade area
 List of bilateral free trade agreements
 European Union Association Agreement
 Euro-Mediterranean free trade area
 Union for the Mediterranean
 Protocol on Economic Relations
Israel Export Institute

Notes

References

External links
Foreign Trade Administration of the Israeli Ministry of Economy and Industry

Economy of Israel
Foreign relations of Israel
Free trade agreements
Israel
Bilateral trading relationships